Herbert Alfred Wellington "Bert" Plaxton (April 22, 1901 – November 7, 1970) was a Canadian ice hockey player who competed in the 1928 Winter Olympics.

In 1928 he was a member of the University of Toronto Grads, the Canadian team which won the gold medal with his brother Hugh and cousin Roger.

External links
profile

References

1901 births
1970 deaths
Canadian ice hockey players
Ice hockey players at the 1928 Winter Olympics
Olympic gold medalists for Canada
Olympic ice hockey players of Canada
Toronto Varsity Blues ice hockey players
Olympic medalists in ice hockey
Medalists at the 1928 Winter Olympics